Monk, Trane, Miles & Me is an album by the guitarist Larry Coryell, recorded in 1998 and released on the HighNote label the following year.

Reception

In his review on AllMusic, Michael G. Nastos states: "This recording properly acknowledges Coryell's main influences, swings nicely, delves into his under-appreciated mellow side, and reaffirms his status as an enduring jazz guitarist who still has plenty to say  ... this finely crafted recording ranks with any of his many better-to-best dates". In JazzTimes, Jim Ferguson wrote: "Once a young lion of jazz guitar, Coryell is gradually becoming one of its greatest seasoned veterans, as this material strongly suggests".

Track listing 
All compositions by Larry Coryell except where noted
 "Star Eyes" (Gene DePaul, Don Raye) – 6:45
 "Alone Together" (Arthur Schwartz, Howard Dietz) – 5:48	
 "Trinkle, Tinkle" (Thelonious Monk) – 5:30
 "Fairfield County Blues" – 5:59
 "Patience" (Santi Debriano) – 7:12
 "Up 'Gainst the Wall" (John Coltrane) – 6:24
 "Naima" (Coltrane) – 6:09
 "All Blues" (Miles Davis) – 7:39
 "Almost a Waltz" – 5:08

Personnel 
Larry Coryell – guitar
Willie Williams – tenor saxophone (tracks 3 & 6)
John Hicks – piano (tracks 1, 4, 5 & 7)
Santi Debriano – bass
Yoron Israel – drums

References 

Larry Coryell albums
1999 albums
HighNote Records albums
Albums recorded at Van Gelder Studio